The women's singles Squash event was part of the squash programme and took place between September 30 and October 4, at the Yangsan College Gymnasium.

Schedule
All times are Korea Standard Time (UTC+09:00)

Results

Final

Top half

Bottom half

References 

2002 Asian Games Official Report, Page 707
Results

Squash at the 2002 Asian Games